= Laurent Dareau =

Laurent Dareau (born in Paris, France) is a French-American portrait painter and visual artist. He received his Master of Fine Arts from the National Superior Decorative Art School (French: École Nationale Supérieure des Arts Décoratifs, ENSAD) in Paris in 1997 and his Bachelor of Fine Arts from the National Fine Art School (French: École Nationale des Beaux-Arts) in Lyon in 1992. He also works professionally under the name Laurent Saint-Ar and the brand Saint-Ar.

== Early life and education ==
Dareau was born and raised in Paris, France. He studied fine art at the National Fine Art School in Lyon, where he received a Bachelor of Fine Arts in 1992. He subsequently trained at the National Superior Decorative Art School (ENSAD) in Paris, one of France's most prestigious art institutions, completing his Master of Fine Arts in painting in 1997.

== Career ==
=== Early career in France (1997–2003) ===
After completing his graduate studies, Dareau exhibited widely across France. Between 1997 and 2002 he held solo exhibitions in Chamalieres, Paris (Gallery Art Service), Aix-en-Provence, Saint-Paul de Vence (Gallery des Chevaliers), and the City of Vichy. He also exhibited internationally, including a solo show at Bartley Grew Gallery in London. In 1997 he received the Jean Aujame Prize in Paris and the Painting Prize at the National Military Painters' Salon. In 1999 he was awarded the Grand International Prize in Aix-en-Provence.

His work in this period also extended to illustration. In 2003 he illustrated the Rotary International comic book Paul Harris New World Pioneer, published in France.

=== Los Angeles (2004–2013) ===
During this period he worked as a concept artist for the Comedy Central production Baxter and McGuire (2006).

He was commissioned by Warner Bros. Studio to paint an official portrait of actor Heath Ledger following Ledger's death in 2008, which was presented to the Ledger family at the Academy Awards ceremony.

=== Florida (2013–present) ===
Dareau relocated to Florida, initially based in the Naples and Bonita Springs area before establishing himself in West Palm Beach. In 2013 he began exhibiting at Gallery on Fifth in Naples and at Bruce Lurie Gallery.

In 2014 Dareau was featured in a solo artist reception at Lahaina Galleries' first East Coast location in Palm Beach. Florida Weekly described his work as moving "from the lily pads of Monet's garden at Giverny to Florida's water scenes" with "shimmering oils" that "captivate the viewer."

In 2015 he received the 1st Prize at the Bonita Springs Center of the Arts and Best of Show at the UAC Southwest Florida Annual Juried Exhibition in Naples. He also won Best of Show at the Alliance of the Arts in Fort Myers in 2016, as well as the First Award at the Sidney and Berne Davis Art Center in Fort Myers.

In 2017 he was among the artists participating in the West Palm Beach Spring Art Festival, where he was named and photographed by Palm Beach Daily News Arts Editor Jan Sjostrom. The article described Dareau as "affixing tiles to a courtyard wall decorated with painted faces, abstract mosaic designs, and mirrors."

In 2018 he was one of three founding artist-residents of GARALA, an interactive artist-in-residency gallery at CityPlace in West Palm Beach. WPB Magazine Senior Writer Sandra Schulman profiled Dareau and GARALA in a feature spanning six pages: "We wanted to create a space where visitors can experience the creative process in action," Dareau told the publication. "The idea was to create a salon and cultural center where visitors can be educated on the surrounding art."

Also in 2018, Dareau donated a painted portrait of Orange County Sheriff Sandra Hutchens to the OC GRIP (Orange County Gang Reduction & Intervention Partnership) annual gala fundraiser in Irvine, California; the portrait sold for $10,000 at silent auction. Later that year he donated a memorial portrait of Costa Mesa Fire Captain Mike Kreza to the Costa Mesa Fire & Rescue Department in California following Kreza's death. The Los Angeles Times reported the donation, quoting Dareau: "Capt. Kreza is gone, stolen too early from our hearts. As a father, I am broken-hearted for his precious daughters and his lovely wife."

In 2019 his work was included in a group exhibition, "Art Expression of France and Argentina," curated from the Lelia Mordoch Gallery collection and hosted at the NSU Alvin Sherman Library's Cotilla Gallery at Nova Southeastern University in Fort Lauderdale. He also exhibited at the Palm Beach Art, Antique & Design Showroom's "Rediscovery" exhibition that year, noted by Fine Art Shippers magazine.

In 2020 he participated in the Art Synergy Aid Auction, an online fundraising initiative to provide grants to Palm Beach County artists whose livelihoods had been affected by the COVID-19 pandemic, which was covered by the Palm Beach Daily News. He also exhibited at Art Fort Lauderdale at the Bonnet House Museum & Gardens that year.

In 2021 he exhibited at SCOPE Art Miami through the 11(HellHeaven) Art Gallery (booth A013), one of the major satellite fairs during Miami Art Week.

In October/November 2024, International Artist magazine published a full feature on Dareau titled "Grace and Elegance" in its Master Painters section, describing his work in oil and his practice as a figurative and portrait painter.

In February 2025, Florida Weekly reported that Dareau was commissioned to create a new work for the 31st annual Center for Creative Education Spring Dinner, "The Art of Giving," held at Club Colette in Palm Beach. The piece was described as inspired by his conversations with students at The Foundations School.

== Style and practice ==
Dareau's work spans portraiture, landscape, and figurative painting, primarily in oil. His portraits of public figures have been noted for their psychological depth. His landscape work has drawn comparisons to the Impressionist tradition, particularly in his depictions of water and natural light. His figurative paintings engage with classic art history and contemporary pop culture simultaneously, described in WPB Magazine as work that "interplays culture and history," drawing on Disney imagery, Whistler, and Norman Rockwell alongside contemporary subjects.

He has described his philosophy as creating "a salon and cultural center where visitors can be educated on the surrounding art," emphasizing the importance of public access to the artistic process.

== Public collections ==
Dareau's work is held in public and institutional collections including:

- Costa Mesa Fire & Rescue Department, California
- Sheriff's Department, Orange County, California
- Fire Department, Bonita Springs, Florida
- The Joyful Child Foundation, California
- Guide Dogs for the Blind, Bay Area, California
- Museum of American History, Philadelphia, Pennsylvania
- Rotary International, Chicago, Illinois
- French Foreign Legion Headquarters (COMLE), France
- 1st Foreign Infantry Regiment, French Foreign Legion, Aubagne, France
- 6th Cuirassiers Regiment, Olivet, France
- 92nd Infantry Regiment, Clermont-Ferrand, France
- Murol Museum, France
- City of Vernon, France

== Awards and recognition ==
- 1994: 1st Prize, City of Vernon, France
- 1994: Booksellers' Prize (French: Prix des Libraires), Sierre, Switzerland
- 1995: Prize of the City of Paris, France
- 1996: 1st Prize, "Artists of Auvergne" Competition, France
- 1996: Grand Prize, National Military Painters' Salon, Lyon, France
- 1997: Painting Prize, National Military Painters' Salon, Paris, France
- 1997: Jean Aujame Prize, Paris, France
- 1999: Grand International Prize, Aix-en-Provence, France
- 2008: 1st Prize, National Military Painters' Salon, France
- 2014: Public Prize, Chalk Art Festival of Naples, Florida
- 2015: 1st Prize, Bonita Springs Center of the Arts, Florida
- 2015: Best of Show, UAC Southwest Florida Annual Juried Exhibition, Naples, Florida
- 2016: Best of Show, Alliance of the Arts, Fort Myers, Florida
- 2016: First Award, Sidney and Berne Davis Art Center, Fort Myers, Florida

== Selected exhibitions ==
=== Solo exhibitions (selected) ===
- 1997: Gallery Art Service, Paris, France
- 1999: Gallery des Chevaliers, Saint-Paul de Vence, France
- 1999: Bartley Grew Gallery, London, UK
- 2006: Gallery Lawrence Asher, Los Angeles, California
- 2013: Bruce Lurie Gallery, Los Angeles, California
- 2014: Lahaina Gallery, Palm Beach, Florida
- 2015: World Trade Gallery, New York City
- 2017: Danieli Art World, West Palm Beach, Florida
- 2018: GARALA Gallery, CityPlace, West Palm Beach, Florida

=== Group and fair exhibitions (selected) ===
- 2010–2012: Red Dot Miami, Bruce Lurie Gallery (three consecutive years)
- 2011: Hampton Art Fair
- 2012: San Francisco Art Fair
- 2015: Jeanne Chisholm Gallery, Palm Beach, Florida
- 2016: 55 Bellechasse Gallery, Paris, France
- 2016: Art Wynwood, Miami; SCOPE NYC; Art Paris
- 2017: West Palm Beach Spring Art Festival
- 2019: "Art Expression of France and Argentina," NSU Alvin Sherman Library / Lelia Mordoch Gallery, Fort Lauderdale, Florida
- 2019: Palm Beach Art, Antique & Design Showroom
- 2019: Via Arts Project, Palm Beach, Florida
- 2020: Art Fort Lauderdale, Bonnet House Museum & Gardens
- 2021: SCOPE Art Miami, 11(HellHeaven) Art Gallery
